Efrem Zimbalist Sr. ( – February 22, 1985) was a concert violinist, composer, conductor and director of the Curtis Institute of Music.

Early life
Efrem Zimbalist Sr. was born on April 9, 1888, O. S., equivalent to April 21, 1889, in the Gregorian calendar, as reported in many newspaper obituaries, in the southwestern Russian city of Rostov-on-Don, the son of Jewish parents Maria (née Litvinoff) and Aron Zimbalist (Цимбалист, Russian pronunciation ), who was a conductor. By the age of nine, Efrem Zimbalist was first violin in his father's orchestra. At age 12 he entered the Saint Petersburg Conservatory and studied under Leopold Auer. He graduated from the Conservatory in 1907 after winning a gold medal and the Rubinstein Prize, and by age 21 was considered one of the world's greatest violinists.

Career
After graduation he debuted in Berlin (playing the Brahms Concerto) and London in 1907 and in the United States in 1911, with the Symphony Orchestra. In 1912, he played the Glazunov Concerto in a concert marking Leopold Stokowski's first appearance with the London Symphony Orchestra. He then settled in the United States. He did much to popularize the performance of classical music in his adopted country. In 1917, he was elected as an honorary member of Phi Mu Alpha Sinfonia, the national fraternity for men in music, by the fraternity's Alpha Chapter at the New England Conservatory of Music in Boston. He retired as a violinist in 1949, but returned in 1952 to give the first performance of the Violin Concerto by Gian Carlo Menotti. He retired again in 1955. He served as a juror of the International Tchaikovsky Competition in 1962 and 1966.

Early in his career he owned the "Titian" Stradivarius violin.

Curtis Institute

In 1928, Zimbalist began teaching at the Curtis Institute of Music in Philadelphia. He was its director from 1941 to 1968. His pupils included such distinguished musicians as Lynn Blakeslee, Aaron Rosand, Oscar Shumsky, Norman Carol, Joseph Silverstein, Jascha Brodsky, John Dalley, Michael Tree, Felix Slatkin, Shmuel Ashkenasi, Harold Wippler, Leonid Bolotine, Takaoki Sugitani, Helen Kwalwasser, and Hidetaro Suzuki.

Compositions
His own compositions include a violin concerto, a piano concerto (1959), the American Rhapsody, a tone poem called Daphnis and Chloe, a Fantasy on themes from The Golden Cockerel by Nikolai Rimsky-Korsakov, a Fantasy on Bizet's Carmen (1936), and a piece called Sarasateana, for viola and piano. He also wrote an opera, Landara, which premiered in 1956.

Dedications 
Several composers dedicated their works to Zimbalist, including:

 František Drdla's Guitarrero
 Edvard Grieg's 4 Humoresques
 Victor Küzdő's Promenade Grotesque
 Cyril Scott's Tallahassee
 Willem Willeke's Chant Sans Paroles

Public life
Pablo Casals writes in his biography, Joys and Sorrows, that Zimbalist was a member of the 's Committee to Aid Spanish Democracy which Casals founded and chaired in 1936.

Personal life

Zimbalist married the famous American soprano Alma Gluck and they toured together for a time.  Alma Gluck died in 1938. In 1943, having been a widower for five years, he married the Curtis Institute of Music's founder, Mary Louise Curtis Bok, daughter of publisher Cyrus Curtis and Louisa Knapp Curtis, and 14 years his senior.

Although he continued to consider himself ethnically Jewish, he found himself attracted, along with his wife Alma, to Anglican Christianity, and they regularly attended the Episcopal Church in New Hartford. Efrem Jr. and Maria were both christened there, and the couple placed Efrem in an Episcopal boarding school in New Hampshire. Efrem Jr. later became active in evangelical circles and was one of the founders of Trinity Broadcasting Network.

He died in 1985, at the age of 95. His and Alma's son, Efrem Zimbalist Jr., and their granddaughter, Stephanie Zimbalist, both became popular actors, primarily in television. Efrem Jr. portrayed Dandy Jim Buckley in Maverick opposite James Garner, and the lead characters in the television series 77 Sunset Strip and The FBI. Granddaughter Stephanie played the female lead in Remington Steele opposite Pierce Brosnan.

References

Further 
 Efrem Zimbalist: A Life – by Roy Malan. Pompton Plains, NJ: Amadeus Press, 2004   
 Great Masters of the Violin – by Boris Schwarz. Simon and Schuster, 1983

External links

 
 Efram Zimbalist recordings at the Discography of American Historical Recordings
 Streaming audio of Efrem Zimbalist recordings from the National Jukebox at the Library of Congress

1889 births
1985 deaths
Musicians from Rostov-on-Don
People from Don Host Oblast
Efrem
Russian Jews
Emigrants from the Russian Empire to the United States
American people of Russian-Jewish descent
Converts to Anglicanism from Judaism
American classical violinists
Male classical violinists
American male violinists
Curtis family
Jewish American classical composers
Jewish classical violinists
Russian classical violinists
American opera composers
Male opera composers
20th-century classical composers
American male classical composers
American classical composers
20th-century classical violinists
20th-century American composers
20th-century American male musicians
20th-century American Episcopalians
20th-century American Jews
20th-century American violinists